Loss is the debut album of Scottish indie pop band Mull Historical Society. It includes the singles "Barcode Bypass", "I Tried", "Animal Cannabus" and "Watching Xanadu". The album reached number 43 in the UK album chart. It was inspired by the sudden death of his father in 1999 and his upbringing on the Isle of Mull. It contains samples from a Caledonian MacBrayne ferry and the waves on Calgary Bay in Mull. "Barcode Bypass" is about a small shopkeeper threatened by the supermarkets, and "Watching Xanadu" is about watching the film Xanadu.

Track listing

"Loss" is a hidden unlisted track at the end of the album - "Paper Houses" ends at 5:18, and "Loss" begins after a 30-second gap.

The CD version of the album was released as an enhanced CD-ROM containing footage of Colin MacIntyre performing live acoustic versions of the songs "Barcode Bypass" and "I Tried".

Personnel
Colin MacIntyre - all vocals, electric guitars, acoustic guitars, bass guitar, keyboards, programming, tapes, baritone guitar on "Instead", whistling on "Instead"
Emma Barlow - additional vocals on "Strangeways Inside"
Phil Cunningham - accordion on "Only I"
Michael Ghia - cello on "Instead"
Brian MacNeil - additional keyboards on "Watching Xanadu", "Only I", "Paper Houses"
Alan Malloy - bass guitar on "I Tried", "Barcode Bypass", "Paper Houses"
Debbie Martin - flute on "Instead", "Mull Historical Society"
Stewart Nisbet - pedal steel guitar on "Only I"
Euan Sinclair - drums on "Barcode Bypass", "Mull Historical Society"
Tony Soave - drums and percussion on all tracks except "Barcode Bypass"
Iain Stewart - additional keyboards on "I Tried", "Barcode Bypass", "Strangeways Inside", "Mull Historical Society"
Graham Weir - trombone on "Only I", "Mull Historical Society"
Neil Weir - trumpet on "Only I", "Mull Historical Society"
David Lee, Graham McCusker, Cameron Dick - choirboys on "Instead"

Reception
Q listed Loss as one of the best 50 albums of 2001.

References

Mull Historical Society albums
2001 debut albums